NPIC may stand for 

 The National Photographic Interpretation Center, a United States imagery intelligence agency that was one of the predecessors of the National Geospatial-Intelligence Agency (NGA)
 National Pesticide Information Center
 National Pingtung Institute of Commerce, a former university in Taiwan